Hainan Boying Football Club are a China League Two club. They are an association football club from Hainan. The Hainan Sport School Stadium is their home venue.

History
Hainan Seamen was founded in 2015 and are among the most successful amateur football clubs in the country. In the same year, they won their local league championship and finished up as runners-up in 2015 China Amateur Football League, gaining promotion to China League Two.

Since 2016, they have been members of the China League Two. Also that year, they changed their name to Hainan Boying & Seamen.

In January 2017, they changed their name again, to Hainan Boying. In Season 2018 it was ranked 16th, which was its best result but could not make it enter the elimination squad of the South District; the club was in financial difficulty and failed to find a new operator and was finally disqualified for the new season on 28 February 2019 for wage arrears.

Name history
2015  Hainan Seamen F.C. 海南海汉
2016  Hainan Boying & Seamen F.C. 海南博盈海汉
2017–2019  Hainan Boying F.C. 海南博盈

Managerial history
  Li Xiao (2015–2016)
  Mai Chao (2017)
  Pedro Rodrigues (2017)
  Zhang Bing (2018)
  Guo Yijun (caretaker) (2018)

Results
All-time league rankings

As of the end of 2018 season.

Key
 Pld = Played
 W = Games won
 D = Games drawn
 L = Games lost
 F = Goals for
 A = Goals against
 Pts = Points
 Pos = Final position

 DNQ = Did not qualify
 DNE = Did not enter
 NH = Not Held
 – = Does Not Exist
 R1 = Round 1
 R2 = Round 2
 R3 = Round 3
 R4 = Round 4

 F = Final
 SF = Semi-finals
 QF = Quarter-finals
 R16 = Round of 16
 Group = Group stage
 GS2 = Second Group stage
 QR1 = First Qualifying Round
 QR2 = Second Qualifying Round
 QR3 = Third Qualifying Round

References

Defunct football clubs in China
Football clubs in China